The Youngest of the Hamr Family is a Czechoslovak television series which was first broadcast in 1975. The show was written by Jaroslav Dietl and directed by Evžen Sokolovský.

References

External links
 Nejmladší z rodu Hamrů on CSFD.cz
 

Czechoslovak television series
1975 Czechoslovak television series debuts
Czech drama television series
1970s Czechoslovak television series
Czechoslovak Television original programming